Emon Saha is a Bangladeshi composer, musician and singer. He earned 7 Bangladesh National Film Awards for his music composition and direction in the films Chandragrohon (2008), Kusum Kusum Prem (2011), Ghetuputra Komola (2012), Pita (2012), Meyeti Ekhon Kothay Jabe (film) (2016), Jannat (2018) and Anando Ashru (2020)

Early life
Saha is the son of the Bangladesh National Film Award winning musician Satya Saha. He first took his Hindustani Classical sangeet training from Satindra Nath Halder. He also learned from his father and Academy Award-winning music composer A.R. Rahman's KM Music Conservatory.

Works

Film playback songs
 Shoshur Bari Zindabad (2001)
 Khairun Shundori (2003)
 Chandragrohon (2008)
 Kusum Kusum Prem (2011)
 Ghetuputra Komola (2012)
 Pita (2012)
 Alpo Alpo Prem-er Golpo (2013)
 Antaranga
 Brihonnola (2013)
 Mon Joley
 Desha: The Leader (2014)
 Agnee 2 (2015)
 Kartoos (2015)

Awards

References

External links
 

Living people
21st-century Bangladeshi male singers
21st-century Bangladeshi singers
Bangladeshi composers
Best Music Director National Film Award (Bangladesh) winners
Year of birth missing (living people)
Place of birth missing (living people)
Best Music Composer National Film Award (Bangladesh) winners
Bangladeshi Hindus